
Gmina Stare Miasto is a rural gmina (administrative district) in Konin County, Greater Poland Voivodeship, in west-central Poland.

Villages
Gmina Stare Miasto contains the villages and settlements of Barczygłów, Bicz, Bicz-Ostatki, Główiew, Janowice, Karsy, Kazimierów, Krągola, Krągola Pierwsza, Kruszyna, Lisiec Mały, Lisiec Nowy, Lisiec Wielki, Modła Królewska, Modła Księża, Modła-Kolonia, Niklas, Nowiny, Posada, Posoka, Przysieka, Rumin, Tomaszew, Trójka, Żdżary, Żdżary-Kolonia, Zgoda and Żychlin.

Neighbouring gminas
Gmina Stare Miasto is bordered by the city of Konin and by the gminas of Golina, Krzymów, Rychwał, Rzgów and Tuliszków.

References
Polish official population figures 2006

Stare Miasto
Konin County